Allan Bengtsson (30 June 1889 – 7 May 1955) was a Swedish athlete. He competed in the men's standing high jump at the 1908 Summer Olympics.

References

External links
 

1889 births
1955 deaths
Athletes (track and field) at the 1908 Summer Olympics
Swedish male high jumpers
Olympic athletes of Sweden
People from Karlskrona
Sportspeople from Blekinge County
20th-century Swedish people